Leila Luliana da Costa Vieira Lopes Umenyiora (born 26 February 1986) is an Angolan model and beauty queen best known for having been crowned Miss Universe 2011. She had previously won Miss Angola UK 2010 and Miss Angola 2010.

Early life
Lopes was born on February 26, 1986, in Benguela, Angola. Prior to being a contestant in beauty pageants, she studied business management at the University of Suffolk in Ipswich, UK. Lopes is actively involved in raising awareness about HIV/AIDS and the discrimination that people with the disease experience.

Pageantry

Miss Angola UK 2010
While living and studying in England, she participated in Miss Angola UK on 8 October 2010. Lopes won the title, giving her the opportunity to represent the British Angolan community in Miss Angola 2010.

Miss Angola 2010
Lopes beat 20 other candidates to be named Miss Angola in Luanda on 18 December 2010, gaining her the right to represent Angola in Miss Universe 2011. She also obtained the Photogenic Award during the contest.

Miss Universe 2011

On 12 September 2011, Lopes was crowned Miss Universe in São Paulo, Brazil, receiving the title from the former Miss Universe Ximena Navarrete of Mexico. She is currently the 60th Miss Universe titleholder, and is the first Angolan woman to hold the position. Lopes is the 5th woman of African descent to win the title since the beginning of the worldwide pageant (following Miss Trinidad and Tobago in 1977, Miss USA in 1995, Miss Trinidad and Tobago in 1998, and Miss Botswana in 1999) and the fourth African woman from the African continent to win following Mpule Kwelagobe, Miss Universe 1999 from Botswana.

In October 2011, Lopes paid a visit to Indonesia where she attended local charity events and Puteri Indonesia 2011 Pageant held at Jakarta Convention Center, in Jakarta.

In December 2011, Lopes was invited to attend the first edition of the Miss Gabon Pageant in Libreville, Gabon where she crowned the first Gabonese representative to Miss Universe, Marie-Noëlle Ada Meyo from Ngounié Province.

In February 2012, Lopes visited Johannesburg, South Africa. On arrival she was welcomed by Miss South Africa 2011 Melinda Bam at a red carpet event in Sun City. During her visit, Lopes attended a launch event for African Fashion International on February 16 in support of Joburg Fashion Week 2012. She also visited one of Melinda Bam's supported charities - Thuthuzela, an NGO which looks after abandoned and orphaned children in Alexandra Township. Lopes also attended the State of the Province Address by Honourable Thandi Modise, Premier of the North-West, on 17 February at the North-West University, Mafikeng Campus.

Lopes travelled to Düsseldorf, Germany with her fellow titleholders Alyssa Campanella and Danielle Doty for a week-long USO/Armed Forces Entertainment tour from 9–14 March 2012. During the week, she also participated in the Beauty International Trade Show which took place at Düsseldorf Exhibition Centre.

Lopes walked the red carpet at the Cannes Film Festival in Cannes, France on 23 May 2012. She also attended the De Grisogono Glam Extravaganza held at the Hotel Du Cap Eden-Roc in Cap D'Antibes, France on the same day. Prior to her visit to France, she was in Lisbon, Portugal for a series of photoshoots and television appearances, at the invitation of Maxim Portugal Magazine.

In June 2012, Lopes embarked on a 5-country West African tour to Senegal, Côte d'Ivoire, Ghana, Togo and Nigeria. Later that month, Lopes attended the Rio+20 United Nations Conference on Sustainable Development in Rio de Janeiro, Brazil.

Controversy around legitimacy of Miss Angola UK victory
After Lopes was crowned Miss Universe 2011, allegations arose that false documents were used to allow her to participate in Miss Angola UK, which enabled her to compete in Miss Angola and subsequently Miss Universe. It was claimed that Lopes had never lived outside of Angola at the time she competed, so should not have been allowed to enter a competition that was exclusively for Angolan citizens living in the UK. The use of false documents has since been denied by both Lopes and the Miss Universe organizers and Lopes herself has stated that she had lived in England for a total of four years.

Personal life
In February 2013, she became engaged to former New York Giants defensive end Osi Umenyiora in Monaco. They were married on 30 May 2015. They have two children together.

References

External links

Official Miss Angola website
The Washington Post : Miss Universe backlash: Miss France speaks out against Miss Angola

1986 births
Living people
Beauty pageant controversies
Miss Angola winners
Miss Universe 2011 contestants
People from Benguela
Angolan beauty pageant winners
Miss Universe winners
Alumni of the University of Suffolk